This is a list of submissions for the Academy Award for Best Animated Feature since it started in 2001 (where DreamWorks Animation's Shrek was the inaugural winner.). An animated feature is defined by the academy as a film with a running time of more than 40 minutes in which characters' performances are created using a frame-by-frame technique, a significant number of the major characters are animated, and animation figures in no less than 75 percent of the running time.

The entire AMPAS membership has been eligible to choose the winner since the award's inception. If there are sixteen or more films submitted for the category, the winner is voted from a shortlist of five films, which has happened nine times, otherwise there will only be three films on the shortlist. Additionally, eight eligible animated features must have been theatrically released in Los Angeles County within the calendar year for this category to be activated.

Some submissions to the Best Animated Feature category were live-action/animation hybrids, but only three films were disqualified for not meeting the 75 percent threshold. This happened with Arthur and the Invisibles in 2006, Yogi Bear in 2010, and The Smurfs in 2011. Consequently, the former two disqualifications reduced the shortlist from five films to three films in 2006 and 2010 respectively, while the latter in 2011 did not.

Only one submission was withdrawn from the competition. This happened in 2020 when The SpongeBob Movie: Sponge on the Run was withdrawn for failing to complete qualification runs needed to be eligible.

2000s

2001

2002

2003

2004

2005

2006

2007

2008

2009

2010s

2010

2011

2012

2013

2014

2015

2016

2017

2018

2019

2020s

2020

2021

2022

See also
Submissions for Best Animated Short Academy Award
Academy Award for Best Animated Feature
Academy Award for Best Animated Short Film

Notes

References

History of animation
Best Animated Feature submissions
American animation awards
Awards for best animated feature film